Marjan Dominko (born 3 September 1969) is a former Slovenian footballer.

Career
Dominko has been capped four times for the Slovenian national team between 1998–1999.

External links
Player profile at NZS 

1969 births
Living people
Slovenian footballers
Slovenian PrvaLiga players
Slovenian Second League players
Slovenia international footballers
NK Mura players
NK Nafta Lendava players
Association football forwards
Association football defenders